Secretly Greatly is a 2016 South Korean television program starring by Yoon Jong-shin, Lee Soo-geun, Kim Hee-chul, Lee Guk-joo and John Park. It aired on MBC every Sundays at 18:45 (KST) starting December 4, 2016, forming part of MBC's Sunday Night lineup. It aired after King of Mask Singer and replaced Real Men. The last episode of this program was broadcast on May 21, 2017.

Format
Secretly Greatly, also known as Hidden Camera (season 3), a new corner related with Hidden Camera (몰래카메라) which starred by Lee Kyung-kyu on 1991–1992 (season 1) and 2005–2007 (season 2), a former program to surprise Korean celebrities in various situations, without any notice from the host and its producers.

Hosts
Yoon Jong-shin
Lee Soo-geun
Kim Hee-chul
Lee Guk-joo
John Park

List of episodes

Ratings
In the table below, the blue numbers represent the lowest ratings and the red numbers represent the highest ratings.

Notes

Awards and nominations

References

External links
 

2016 South Korean television series debuts
2017 South Korean television series endings
Korean-language television shows
MBC TV original programming
South Korean variety television shows
South Korean reality television series